The Premier Arena Soccer League (PASL) is an indoor soccer league with mostly semi-professional teams; along with a number of amateur teams across North America. The PASL was previously known as the Federation of Sports Arenas (FSA). The PASL logo formerly belonged to what is now the Major Arena Soccer League.

Teams play in regional competition to keep travel costs to a minimum. The champion of each region then compete in a playoff tournament to decide the league champion.

PASL currently runs a men's winter and summer league as well as women's summer league. The winter league typically starts in December and ends in March. The summer league runs from May through early August.

PASL is an affiliated member of the Pan-American Minifootball Federation and the World Minifootball Federatio. In 2021, the PASL entered into a cooperative partnership with Major Arena Soccer League 2 (MASL2).

Teams

Men's champions

Women's champions

References

External links
Premier Arena Soccer League website

 
Indoor soccer leagues in the United States
1997 establishments in the United States
Sports leagues established in 1997
Professional Arena Soccer League
Professional sports leagues in the United States
Professional sports leagues in Mexico
Multi-national professional sports leagues